The 1925 New Zealand general election was held 4 November (the Māori vote had taken place the previous day) to elect a total of 80 MPs to the 22nd session of the New Zealand Parliament. A total number of 678,877 (90.02%) voters turned out to vote. In one seat (Bay of Plenty) there was only one candidate.

In 1922, registration as an elector was made compulsory for all those eligible (except Māori).

Results
Gordon Coates continued as Prime Minister, with his Reform Party winning an outright majority of 30.
Leonard Isitt and George Witty were both appointed to the Legislative Council by Gordon Coates on 28 October 1925; shortly before the election on 4 November. Both were Liberals but their retirement removed "a source of some bitterness from the Party's ranks".
Gordon Coates was Reform, and both of their former seats went to Reform candidates.

After the election both Labour and Liberals held 11 seats.

Party totals

Votes summary

Electorate results

The election results were as follows:

Key

|-
 |colspan=8 style="background-color:#FFDEAD" | General electorates
|-

|-
 |colspan=8 style="background-color:#FFDEAD" | Māori electorates
|-

|}
Table footnotes:

Notes

References

External links
Labour Party candidates 1925 (photomontage)